Jefferson Street is a prominent street  in Savannah, Georgia, United States. The street is named for Thomas Jefferson, third president of the United States. Its northern section passes through the Savannah Historic District, a National Historic Landmark District.

Jefferson Street runs beside six squares. From north to south:

To the west of
Ellis Square
Telfair Square
Orleans Square
Pulaski Square
Chatham Square

To the east of
Franklin Square

Notable buildings and structures

Below is a selection of notable buildings and structures on Jefferson Street, all in Savannah's Historic District. From north to south:

George Wymberly Jones DeRenne (Estate of) Property, 1 Jefferson Street (1893)
109–111 Jefferson Street (1909)
Anna Keilbach Building (north), 113–115 Jefferson Street (1883)
Anna Keilbach Building (south), 117–119 Jefferson Street (1883)
Julia Dancy Range, 134–142 Jefferson Street (1884)
St. Philip Monumental AME Church, 1112 Jefferson Street (1911)

References

Roads in Savannah, Georgia
Streets in Georgia (U.S. state)